Braase is a surname. Notable people with the surname include:

Ib Braase (1923–2009), Danish sculptor
Ordell Braase (1932–2019), American football player

See also 
 Brase, another surname